Nina Shaw is an American talent attorney whose clients include Jamie Foxx and Nick Cannon. She is a partner at Del Shaw Moonves Tanaka Finkelstein and Lezcano Law Firm.

Women in Film gave her the Crystal Award in 2005 for her work in entertainment, which was "a testament to her distinction among Hollywood's movers and shakers". In 2013, the Beverly Hills Bar Association named Shaw the Entertainment Attorney of the Year. Shaw was recognized in 2011 by The Hollywood Reporter's Women in Entertainment 2011: Power 100.

Life
Shaw was born and raised in Harlem, New York. She also spent some time in The Bronx. Upon graduating from William Howard Taft High School, Shaw attended Barnard College, where she received her B.A. in 1976. She went on to Columbia Law School and earned her J.D. in 1979. Shaw is married, lives in Los Angeles with her husband and has two adult daughters. She is African-American. Shaw is on the Motion Picture & Television Fund (MPTF) Board of Directors.  
She also appeared in an episode of The A-Team (“Steel” in 1975) as a tourist.

References

External links
 
 

Year of birth missing (living people)
Living people
African-American women lawyers
African-American lawyers
American talent agents
Barnard College alumni
Columbia Law School alumni
People from Harlem
21st-century African-American people
21st-century African-American women